The pygmy gourami (Trichopsis pumila), also known as the sparkling gourami, is a freshwater species of gourami native to Southeast Asia.

Description
Pygmy gouramis can reach a length of  SL.  In color, they sparkle with red, green, and blue hues, and can produce an audible croaking noise using a specialised pectoral mechanism. In the right light, its eyes appear bright blue, and its arrowhead-shaped body and caudal fins reflect a rainbow of colors as it swims.  Sexing is difficult, but males have red spots above the "body line" or the stripe through their body, and females spots are duller.

Habitat
Its native habitat is slow rivers, rice paddies, ditches and small ponds.  It is most commonly found in standing not stagnant water (including waters with low oxygen levels) that has a dense cover of floating plants. The pygmy gourami can survive in these waters because of its labyrinth organ, which allows it to breathe air from the surface. Its native habitat has a pH of 6.0–7.5, dH of 5–19, and temperature 25 °C to 28 °C (77 °F to 83 °F).  It feeds on zooplankton and aquatic insects.

Importance to humans
The pygmy gourami can be found in the aquarium trade.

In the aquarium
The pygmy gourami is hardy and tolerant of less-than-ideal water conditions in the tank.  It is important to avoid any strong currents in the aquarium and have plenty of hiding places; a heavily planted tank with subdued lighting is ideal.  They require some space between the top of the water and the tank cover from which to gulp air.  Preferred water conditions include a temperature of 25 °C (76 °F) or above, and a pH of less than 7.

While these are not schooling fish, they can usually be kept peacefully in small groups.  Keep in mind that they will not compete well for food with aggressive tank mates and will not cope well with constant harassment.  Notoriously nippy fish such as tiger barbs or large danios are poor choices for tank companions.  Because of their small size, pygmy gouramis are an ideal choice for smaller aquaria. A good size aquarium for a trio or pair would be a planted 5 gallon tank. They will be targeted by male bettas so should not be kept with them.

They are not finicky about food, and will readily accept flake foods, live foods, or frozen foods. They should be fed once or twice every day.

Breeding
Pygmy gouramis can be induced to breed by raising the temperature and dropping the water level about 15 cm (6 inches).  During mating, the male embraces the female, with their bodies intertwining tightly.  The female deposits the eggs and both the male and female will collect the eggs in their mouths and deposit them into a bubble nest created earlier by the male.    Other tankmates should ideally be removed at this point, since the male vigorously guards the eggs and may attack other fish.  The male can be left with the eggs until they hatch.   The fry are tiny and require microscopic infusoria until they are large enough to accept newly hatched brine shrimp or dry food.  The water in the tank should be kept very clean with frequent water changes.

References

Pygmy gourami
Fishkeeping
Fish of Southeast Asia
Fish of Thailand
Freshwater fish of Indonesia
Freshwater fish of Malaysia
Fish described in 1936